The Germany women's national under-20 football team represents the female under-20s of Germany in the FIFA U-20 Women's World Cup, and is controlled by the German Football Association.

History

The German U-20 team and Nordic Cup
The German U-20 team participated in the Nordic Cup since the early '90s. Winning the tournament in 1995. Nordic Cup was a U-20 competition from 1990 to 1997.

Change of U-18 to U-19
The first three tournaments of the UEFA Women's Under-19 Championship were in the U-18 category. In 2001, the German Football Association decided to change the age limit from the U-18 team to U-19.  The move was in preparation for 2002 UEFA Women's Under-19 Championship (competition that served as a qualifying tournament for the 2002 FIFA U-19 Women's World Championship).

Competing as a U-20 team

2005 and 2006
As the German Football Association did in 2001 prior to the introduction of the U-19 tournament, they raised the age of the squad from U-19 to U-20 in 2005. The move was, again, in response to FIFA's altering of the competition from U-19 to U-20.

Fixtures and results

 Legend

2022

Players
Squad for 2018 FIFA U-20 Women's World Cup in France

Caps and goals as of 24 July 2018.

Head coach: Maren Meinert

Competitive record

FIFA U-20 Women's World Cup
The German team has participated in all tournaments. They have been champions in three opportunities (2004, 2010 and 2014)

UEFA Women's Under-19 Championship
The German team has participated in the UEFA Women's Under-19 Championship 19 times; Winning it six times and setting the record for most titles.

See also
 Germany women's national football team
 Germany women's national under-19 football team
 Germany women's national under-17 football team
 FIFA U-20 Women's World Cup
 UEFA Women's Under-19 Championship

References

External links
 Site of the Under-20 national team at the German Football Association 
 FIFA U-20 Women's World Cup Germany team page

 

Youth football in Germany
European women's national under-20 association football teams
Football